Jonathan Philip Parry, commonly referred to as Jon Parry, (born 1957) is professor of Modern British History at the University of Cambridge and Fellow of Pembroke College. He has specialised in 19th and 20th century British political and cultural history and has developed a later interest in the relationship between Britain and the Ottoman Empire.

Parry was born in 1957. He matriculated at Peterhouse, Cambridge in 1975 and subsequently became Fellow of that college before moving to Pembroke College in 1992. In 2009 he was appointed as a professor in the university's history faculty.

Parry was for some time the Director of the Isaac Newton Trust, a post that he relinquished in 2015 when he took academic leave. He was President of Pembroke College in 2018-2019.

A revised version of Parry's PhD thesis, which had been supervised by Derek Beales, was published in 1986 as Democracy and Religion: Gladstone and the Liberal Party 1867-1875. A review of this noted that Parry was from a similar school of thought as Maurice Cowling, another Petrean don of whom he later wrote various posthumous accounts.

The scholarly literature on British historiography includes Parry as a leader of the Cambridge school of modern politics, as shown by Alex Middleton in 2021.

Works

Democracy and Religion: Gladstone and the Liberal party, 1867-1875 (Cambridge, 1986)
The Rise and Fall of Liberal Government in Victorian Britain (Yale 1993)

Parliament and the Church, 1529-1960 (ed. with Stephen Taylor, 2000)

The impact of Napoleon III on British politics, 1851-1880, Transactions of the Royal Historical Society (2001)

The Politics of Patriotism: English Liberalism, national identity and Europe 1830-1886 (Cambridge, 2006)
Benjamin Disraeli (Oxford, 2007)
Liberalism and liberty, in Liberty and Authority in Victorian Britain, ed. P. Mandler (Oxford, 2007)
Whig monarchy, Whig nation: Crown, politics and representativeness, 1880-2000, in The Monarchy and the British Nation, 1780 to the present, ed. A. Olechnowicz (Cambridge, 2007)
The decline of institutional reform in nineteenth-century Britain, in Structures and Transformations in Modern British History, ed. D . Feldman and J. Lawrence (Cambridge, 2011)
Steam power and British influence in Baghdad, 1820-1860, Historical Journal (March 2013)

Notes

Further reading
 Bahners, Patrick. "Jonathan Parry, The Rise and Fall of Liberal Government in Victorian Britain, 1993." Francia 22.3 (1995): 228-229. online in German
 Middleton, Alex. "‘High Politics’ and its Intellectual Contexts." Parliamentary History 40.1 (2021): 168-191. online

External links
Blog entries at gov.uk

British historians
Living people
British male non-fiction writers
Alumni of Peterhouse, Cambridge
Fellows of Pembroke College, Cambridge
Fellows of Peterhouse, Cambridge
Members of the University of Cambridge faculty of history
1957 births